Edward Acton was an English politician who was MP for Shropshire in 1378, October 1382, April 1384, November 1384, 1386, and September 1388. He was High Sheriff of Shropshire, alnager, justice of the peace, and tax collector in the same county, and escheator for that county and also Staffordshire and the adjacent marches.

References

English MPs 1378
English MPs October 1382
English MPs April 1384
English MPs November 1384
English MPs 1386
English MPs September 1388
14th-century English politicians
High Sheriffs of Shropshire
Escheators
Alnagers
Tax collectors
English justices of the peace